Connecticut's 99th House of Representatives district elects one member of the Connecticut House of Representatives. It encompasses parts of East Haven and has been represented by Republican Joseph Zullo since 2019.

Recent elections

2020

2018

2016

2014

2012

References

99